Terence Brown (born February 19, 1986) is a former American football offensive guard/center. He attended Brigham Young University and went undrafted in the 2012 NFL Draft and was signed by the Miami Dolphins. Brown was cut on June 11, 2012 to make room for the Dolphins' signing of Chad Johnson.

High school career
Brown attended Summerville High School in Summerville, South Carolina, where he was a two-time all-state offensive lineman. In his Senior season Brown was a Mr South Carolina football finalists.

College career
After lettering his freshman season Brown spent 2 years on a Church mission in Brazil, Brown returned joined the BYU Cougars varsity in 2009. He started all 13 games in 2009, 2010 & 2011 playing a variety of positions on the offense line.

Professional career

Miami Dolphins
He signed with the Miami Dolphins as a Undrafted free agent.

References

External links
Just Sports Stats
BYU bio
Twitter

Further reading

1986 births
Living people
American football offensive tackles
BYU Cougars football players
Miami Dolphins players
People from Summerville, South Carolina
American Mormon missionaries in Brazil
Latter Day Saints from South Carolina